Anish Charak (born 19 April 2000) is an Indian cricketer. He made his Twenty20 debut on 11 January 2021, for Meghalaya in the 2020–21 Syed Mushtaq Ali Trophy.

References

External links
 

2000 births
Living people
Indian cricketers
Meghalaya cricketers
Place of birth missing (living people)